The Irish Moiled is a rare cattle breed from Ireland.    It is a dual-purpose breed, reared for both beef and milk. It originated in County Leitrim, County Sligo, County Down, and County Donegal, but the breed is now found throughout Ireland.

History 
	
The Irish Moiled Cow is one of the oldest breeds of cow in Ireland. Throughout the 19th century, they were relatively popular throughout Ireland, due to being a hardy breed that could effectively be used for both their milk and meat. With the introduction of more specialised breeds (such as friesians for milk, herefords/anguses for beef, etc), their popularity began to decline. By the late 1970’s, there was only 30 cows and 2 bulls remaining, being maintained by only 2 breeders. In 1979 they were marked as “critically endangered” by the Rare Breed Survival Trust.

Characteristics 
The Irish Moiled Cow is one of the most distinctive breeds in Ireland. They are polled cows (they do not grow horns) and are generally red with a white line on the back and stomach. They typically have a flecked face and are dual producers being used for both beef and dairy products, which is uncommon with most breeds. These cows are slightly smaller than average, weighing around 550 kg. The breed originated in County Leitrim, County Sligo, and County Donegal, but is now found throughout Ireland. The name “Irish Moiled Cow” takes its origins from the Irish word Maol meaning bald and references the fact that these cows do not have horns. Until recently the breed was in decline, falling to just two dairy herds in the 1970s with a  population that included just 20 breeding females. However with the introduction of bloodlines from Jersey, Ayrshire, Shorthorn and Friesian breeds the numbers have improved and are now being produced throughout Ireland, as well as in parts of Britain.

Use 
	
Irish Moiled meat is remarked to be of great quality and has a distinct flavour. This cow is known to produce good beef in poor conditions but needs care to protect it from becoming overweight. It was the quality of Irish Moiled beef that had saved the breed from extinction.
	
The Irish Moiled cow has a gestation period of about nine months if kept at a decent health.

References

External links
 The Irish Moiled Cattle Society

Cattle breeds
Cattle breeds originating in Ireland
Animal breeds on the RBST Watchlist